Spry may refer to:

 Spry, Pennsylvania
 Spry (surname), people with the surname Spry
 Spry Vegetable Shortening
 Spry, Inc., creator of Internet in a Box, one of the first commercial software packages for connecting to the Internet.
 Spry framework, an open-source Ajax framework for web development

See also
 
 
 Spray (disambiguation)
 Spy (disambiguation)